Oğuz Yılmaz may refer to:

 Oğuz Yılmaz (musician) (1968-2021), Turkish folk musician
 Oğuz Yılmaz (footballer) (born 1993), Turkish footballer